Michael D. Smigiel Sr. (June 18, 1958 – August 28, 2022) was an American politician who was a member of the Maryland House of Delegates, where he represented District 36, which covers Caroline, Cecil, Kent, and Queen Anne's Counties.  He was first elected in 2002 along with fellow Republicans Richard Sossi and Mary Roe Walkup after the legislative boundaries were redrawn.  Prior to 2002, District 36 had a separate representative for Cecil, Kent, and Queen Anne's Counties.  After combining the districts, Smigiel won the seat previously occupied by former Elkton Mayor, James Crouse.  Crouse was appointed to the seat in July 2001 following Governor Parris Glendenning's appointment of longtime Elkton Delegate Ronald A. Guns to the Public Service Commission.
In 2006, he defeated Democratic challenger Mark Guns for reelection.  In the 2006 election, the voting method returned to voting for a representative for each county.

Education
Smigiel attended Elgin Community College in Elgin, Illinois.  There he received his A.A. degree in psychology and history in 1982.  After community college, he went to undergraduate school at Northern Illinois University, where he got his B.A. in political science in 1985.  In 1989, he received his J.D. from Northern Illinois University College of Law. Michael served as president of his law school class.

Career
After high school, Smigiel served in the United States Marine Corps from 1975 until 1979.  After college, Smigiel was admitted to Maryland Bar in 1989 and worked thereafter as an attorney. He was also a member of the Cecil County Bar Association, where he served as chair of the ethics committee and as a member of the board of directors.  He also belonged to the Maryland Association of Justice.

Smigiel was also the founder of Mediation, Inc., and alternative dispute resolution center. He served as a member of the Board of Directors for the Bainbridge Naval Training Center Historical Association, Inc.

In the legislature
In the Maryland General Assembly, Smigiel held the position of Minority Parliamentarian and was on the Judiciary Committee where he was a member of the criminal justice subcommittee and has been active on several work-groups.   He was previously a Deputy Minority Whip from 2003–2006 and a member of the Health and Government Operations Committee. Smigiel served as Vice Chair of the Juvenile subcommittee, and was the Vice Chair of the Eastern Shore Delegation representing the nine counties of the Eastern Shore of Maryland. In addition, Smigiel was the founder and chairperson of the Maryland House of Delegates TEA Party Caucus.

Legislative notes
 in 2014 Co-Sponsored legislation to cut off the National Security Agency's water and electricity if the agency continued to collect electronic data without specific warrants.
 in 2013 Co-Sponsored legislation to require a 2/3rds vote in the General Assembly to raise taxes
 in 2013 Sponsored a bill to repeal the use of speed cameras
 in 2013 Co-Sponsored legislation to impose larger penalties on local governments found to have violated Maryland's open meeting law
 in 2012 Co-sponsored bill to require health insurance carriers to provide coverage of Telemedicine services
 in 2011 Proposed an amendment to the state constitution to make appropriations subject to petition for a referendum, which are currently exempt under Maryland law
 in 2010 Co Sponsored a 'Taxpayers Bill of Rights' constitutional amendment which would have required certain new taxes be placed to a popular vote, limited increases in the state budget to the amount of inflation plus annual population increase
 voted against in-state tuition for illegal immigrants in 2007 (HB6)
 voted against the Clean Indoor Air Act of 2007 (HB359)
 voted for slots in 2005 (HB1361)

Task Force, Boards and Commissions
In 2012, Smigiel was appointed by Maryland legislative leaders to a task force to study the impact of a Maryland Court of Appeals ruling regarding the liability of owners of pit bulls and landlords that rent to them.

Congressional Run

Smiegel claimed that he felt "betrayed" by Harris and other Republicans, and attacked the incumbent from a conservative position on education, state powers, free markets, and taxation. He was overwhelmingly defeated by Harris.

Death
Smigiel died at the age of 64 from a heart disease on August 28, 2022.

Election results 
2006 Race for Maryland House of Delegates – District 36 Cecil County
Voters to choose one per county:
{| class="wikitable"
!Name
!Votes
!Percent
!Outcome
|-
|- 
|Michael D. Smigiel Sr., Rep.
|17,764
|  53.4%
|   Won
|-
|-
|Mark Guns, Dem.
|15,475
|  46.6%
|   Lost
|-
|}

2002 Race for Maryland House of Delegates – District 36
Voters to choose three:
{| class="wikitable"
!Name
!Votes
!Percent
!Outcome
|-
|- 
|Richard Sossi, Rep.
|19,098
|  19.0%
|   Won
|-
|-
|Michael D. Smigiel Sr., Rep.
|19,216
|  19.1%
|   Won
|-
|-
|Mary Roe Walkup, Rep.
|28,230
|  28.0%
|   Won
|-
|-
|Wheeler R. Baker, Dem.
|17,575
|  17.5%
|   Lost
|-
|-
|James G. Crouse, Dem.
|16,329
|  16.2%
|   Lost
|-
|Other Write-Ins
|277
|  0.3%
|   
|}

References and notes

External links
 Michael D. Smigiel, Sr., Maryland State Delegate
 Delegate Mike Smigiel | The Official Blog of Delegate Mike Smigiel, the 36th District

1958 births
2022 deaths
People from Harford County, Maryland
Republican Party members of the Maryland House of Delegates
Politicians from Baltimore
Northern Illinois University alumni
Lawyers from Baltimore
Military personnel from Baltimore
21st-century American politicians